Velia Idalia Aguilar Armendáriz (born 6 February 1960) is a Mexican politician from the National Action Party. From 2009 to 2012 she served as Deputy of the LXI Legislature of the Mexican Congress representing National Action Party.

References

1960 births
Living people
Politicians from Chihuahua (state)
Women members of the Chamber of Deputies (Mexico)
Members of the Chamber of Deputies (Mexico) for Chihuahua (state)
National Action Party (Mexico) politicians
21st-century Mexican politicians
21st-century Mexican women politicians
Autonomous University of Nuevo León alumni
People from Camargo, Chihuahua
Deputies of the LXI Legislature of Mexico